Carolena Jean Carstens Salceda (born January 18, 1996 in Winfield, Illinois, United States) is a taekwondo practitioner representing Panama. She has dual US / Panamanian citizenship through her father and mother respectively,. She used to live in Glen Ellyn, Illinois., but has since moved to Spain.

In 2011, Carstens participated at the Pan American Championships, where she won the silver medal in the youth -52 kg category, losing to the American Deireanne Morales in the final. She subsequently took part in qualification for the 2012 Summer Olympics in November 2011, finishing fourth. She later received one of four wild card entries for the Olympics as the 13th ranked athlete in the -49 kg category, becoming the first Olympic taekwondo athlete from Panama, and the second youngest Olympian in the country's history. She was the youngest athlete at the 2012 Olympics. She lost her first contest 7–2 to an eventual finalist, Spaniard Brigitte Yagüe, and then lost her repechage fight to Mexican Jannet Alegría by the same score.

She competed for Panama at the 2016 Summer Olympics. She was defeated by Raheleh Asemani of Belgium in the first round. She was the flag bearer for Panama during the closing ceremony.

She competed in the women's lightweight event at the 2022 World Taekwondo Championships held in Guadalajara, Mexico.

References

1996 births
Living people
American sportspeople of Panamanian descent
People with acquired Panamanian citizenship
Panamanian female taekwondo practitioners
Olympic taekwondo practitioners of Panama
Taekwondo practitioners at the 2012 Summer Olympics
Taekwondo practitioners at the 2016 Summer Olympics
Pan American Games competitors for Panama
Taekwondo practitioners at the 2015 Pan American Games
People from Winfield, Illinois
People from Glen Ellyn, Illinois
South American Games gold medalists for Panama
South American Games medalists in taekwondo
Competitors at the 2014 South American Games
Taekwondo practitioners at the 2019 Pan American Games
21st-century American women
21st-century Panamanian women